Mario Algaze (1947 – 28 September 2022) was a Cuban-American photographer who photographed musicians and celebrities, in rural and urban areas, throughout Latin America.

Early life 
Algaze was exiled from Cuba in 1960, when he was 13 years old and moved to Miami. Self-taught in photography, he enrolled to study art at Miami Dade College, Florida in the 1970s and went on to work as a freelance photojournalist for national and international publications including the Miami Herald.

Career 
Starting work as a photojournalist in 1971, Algaze went often to Latin America, and the Caribbean (including his native Cuba) to make photographs. From 1979 to 1981 he was the director of the Gallery Exposures in Coral Gables, Florida. During the 1970s he photographed Mick Jagger, Paul McCartney and Frank Zappa. In 1992 Algaze, who previously had developed his photographs in the bathroom, was one of 71 visual artists working in photography and crafts awarded Visual Artists Fellowships of $20,000. He used the fellowship to install a darkroom in his home in which to create 86 exhibition-quality images.

Reception 
In 1983 Ricardo Pau-Llosa wrote that: The kind of photograph which Algaze pursues is more than a frozen image, the souvenir of flux, a stay of mutability. These photographs reveal the spirit of a moment in human space (the "subjects are usually human beings, cities, streets, walls, plazas, rooms, shops, artifacts) as much as the workings of consciousness that graps [sic] this spirit. [...] His is not a tourist's eye giddy with compassion for fallen places. What comes through in his photographs is not simply the arduous predicament of life in Latin America, but the unique scenarios in which life reveals itslef [sic] in this part of the world.Museum of Photographic Arts (MoPA) curator Carol McCusker wrote of Algaze that he "steadily built a sum view of Spanish-speaking countries that no other photographer has done before or since." Curator Jorge Zamanillo remarked that many of Algaze's photographs "evoke the cinematographic spirit that Fellini's films have." 

In Mario Algaze: Portfolio Latino Americano, his friend and colleague, curator Ricardo Viera interpreted his photography as pervasively revealing the often contradictory layering of cultures in Latin and South America. 

Benjamin R. Fraser, Editor-in-Chief of Hispania, perceiving that a 'magic realism;' a Latin idyll, is read into, or imposed on, Algaze's oeuvre, writes in 2004 that "one may somehow suspect that even Algaze's role is not neutral,"  and "that there might be self-tropicalization on his part," in his exclusion of modern, industrial artefacts and goods from his imagery. 

Vince Aletti surveyed his work in A Respect for Light: The Latin American Photographs, 1974-2008  published in 2014, and notes in his foreword that Algaze's theme is "Latin America, both as a place and a state of mind."  

Algaze returned to his homeland Cuba in 1999 after nearly four decades in exile; curator and writer Elizabeth Ferrer attributes Algaze's project to photograph across South America to a nostalgic desire to find "echoes of a beloved Cuba in the old quarters of Latin American cities." 

In 2022 Algaze died in Florida on 28 September.

Individual exhibitions

 1974, 29 October–8 November: Mario Algaze Exhibit. Bacardi Art Gallery, Miami, FL
 1977, from 21 October:17 Color Prints. Sociedad Española de la Florida, 800 Douglas Road, Coral Gables, Miami, FL
 1983 – Light Factory, Charlotte, North Carolina
 1983 – Spirit of Place, Miami Dade Community College, North Campus, Art Gallery, Miami, FL (traveled to Lehigh University Art Gallery, Bethlehem, PA in 1984)
 1984 – Little Havana Series, Barbara Gillman Gallery, Miami, FL
 1984 – Fifteen Recent Images, Coral Gables Public Library, Coral Gables, FL
 1985 – The Artist as a Theme, INTAR Latin American Art Gallery, New York, NY
 1986 – Portraits, Miami Film Festival, Cuban Museum, Miami, FL
 1986 – Portraits, Latin American Intellectuals, Books and Books, Coral Gables, FL
 1987 – El Sur, Miami Dade Community College, North Campus, Art Gallery, Miami, FL
 1989 – Caras, Cuban Museum of Arts and Culture, Miami, FL
 1989 – 45 Imágenes, Museo de Antioquía, Medellín, Colombia
 1989 – El Sur, Fundación del Banco del Comercio, Lima, Perú
 1991 – Portafolio Latinoamericano, curated by Ricardo Viera, opened at the Guayasamín Foundation, Quito, Ecuador (traveled to Lowe Art Museum, Coral Gables, FL; Art Galleries of Lehigh University, Bethlehem, PA; Museo Rayo, Roldanillo Valle, Colombia; Art Museum of the Miami University, Oxford, OH, Norton Gallery of Art, West Palm Beach, FL)
 1991 – An Exercise in color, Barbara Gillman Gallery, Miami, FL
 1991 – 40 Images, L'Alliance Française au Perú, Lima, Perú
 1992 – Film Festival Portraits, Ambrosino Gallery, Coral Gables, FL
 1993 – Portafolio Latinoamericano, 2. Internacionale Fototage, Herten, Germany. Sponsored by AGFA and curated by Michael Koetzle
 1995 – Solo exhibition at the Fundación Guayasamín, Quito, Ecuador. Sponsored by the Alliance Française
 1997 – Portafolio Latinoamericano, Throckmorton Fine Arts Gallery. New York, NY
 1998 – Sur, Freites Revilla Gallery, Coral Gables, FL
 1999 – Sur, Throckmorton Fine Arts Gallery. New York, NY
 1999 – Sur, John Cleary Gallery. Houston, TX
 1999 – Sur, Peter Fetterman Photographic Works of Art, Santa Monica, CA
 2001 – Cuba 1999-2000, Throckmorton Fine Art Gallery, New York, NY
 2001 – Cuba 1999-2000, Books and Books, Coral Cables, FL
 2002 – CUBA 1999-2000, Lowe Art Museum, University of Miami, Coral Gables, FL
 2003 – Mario Algaze, Cuba 1999-2000, University of California, San Diego, CA
 2004 – Selections from Three Decades of Work, Missing Link Gallery, Sarasota
 2005 – Southern Exposure, Barbara Gillman Gallery, Miami, FL

Group exhibitions

 1978, from 11 August: Mario Algaze, Margarita Cano, Oscar Manuel Melian, photographs. Forma, 305 Alcazar, Coral Gables
 1978 – 'Displaced Cuban Photographers'. Washington Projects for The Arts, Washington, D.C.
 1978 – Camerawork Gallery, San Francisco, California
 1979 – Cuban Photographers, Washington Project for the Arts, Washington DC (traveled to Camerawork, San Francisco, CA)
 1984 – Hortt Memorial Exhibition. Museum Of Art, Ft. Lauderdale, FL
 1985 – The Art of Miami, SECCA Winston-Salem, NCGroup Exhibition of Gallery Artists at Gemini Gallery, Palm Beach, FL
 1987 – Outside Cuba/Fuera de Cuba Zimmerli Museum, Rutgers University, New Brunswick, NJ (traveled to Museum of Contemporary Hispanic Art, New York, NY; Art Museum, Miami University, Miami, OH; Museo de Arte de Ponce, Puerto Rico; Center for the Fine Arts, Miami, FL; Atlanta College of Fine Arts, Atlanta, GA)
 1987 – Poetic Visions. Real Art Ways Space, Hartford, CT
 1987 – Contemporary Figurative American Photography, Center For The Fine Arts, Miami. FL
 1987 – Intentions and Techniques, Lehigh University. Bethlehem, PA
 1988 – Of People and Places, Milwaukee Art Museum, Milwaukee, WI (traveled to the Tampa Museum of Art in 1989)
 1988 – Photo Glimpses of Hispanic Culture, Boward Community College, Art Gallery, FL
 1988 – The Image Makers, Museum of Modern Art of Latin America, Washington, DC
 1988 – Eight from Outside of Cuba, Barbara Gillman, Miami, FL
 1989 – South Florida in the Eighties, North Miami Center Of Contemporary Art, North Miami, FL
 1989 - Four Florida Photographers, Stein-Gillman Gallery, Tampa, FL
 1989 – Six in Florida, North Miami Museum Of Art, North Miami, FL
 1990 – Twenty-Five in Miami, Art Gallery, Miami Dade Community College, South Campus, Miami, FL
 1990 – Fact and Fiction: The State of Florida Photography, Norton Gallery of Art, West Palm Beach, FL (traveled to Museum Of Fine Arts, St. Petersburg, FL; Florida State University Fine Arts Gallery and Museum, Tallahassee, FL; Center for the Fine Arts, Miami. FL; Pensacola Museum of Art, Pensacola, FL)
 1991 – Cuba-USA: First Generation, curated by Fondo del Sol Gallery, Washington, DC, opened at Museum of Contemporary Art, Chicago, IL (traveled to Art Museum, Florida International University, Miami, FL, Minnesota Museum of Art, St. Paul, MN)
 1991 – Traveling, Dunedin Fine Art Center, Dunedin, FL
 1991 – Directors Choice, South Florida Cultural Consortium Artist Fellowship Recipients, Norton Gallery of Art, West Palm Beach, FL
 1991 – Other Times, Other Places, Main Public Library, Miami, FL
 1992 – 1991 SAF/NEA Regional Fellowships In Photography, Savannah College of Art and Design, Savannah, GA
 1994 – Portafolio Latinoamericano, Houston Fotofest, Houston, TX. Curated by Ricardo Viera, State University. Curated by Tom Callas and Linda Centell

 1995 – Magic Moments: 40 Years of Leica M, traveled to New York, Paris, Milano, Tokyo, Cologne, Bath, Vienna, Montreux, Luxembourg, Oslo, Beirut, Frankfurt
 1995 – Cintas Fellowship Exhibition, Southeastern Center for Photography, Daytona Beach, FL
 1997 - American Voices, Smithsonian International Gallery, Washington, DC. Curated by Ricardo Viera
 1997 – Once Removed: The Photograph in Contemporary Cuban-American Art, California
 1999 – Theater of the Memory, Five Cuban American Artist Photographers, Centro Cultural Español, Miami, FL. Curated by Ricardo Viera
 2000 – Latin American Photographers, El Museo Del Barrio, New York, NY. Curated by Ricardo Viera
 2001 – 'A Painting for Over the Sofa (that's not necessarily a painting)'; Bernice Steinbaum Gallery, Miami, Florida.
 2001 – Del Sur, Miami Dade Public Library system, Miami, FL. Curated by Barbara Young
 2002 – One Hundred Photographs, A collection by Bruce Bernard, Victoria and Albert Museum, London, England
 2002 – Three Visions of Perú, Throckmorton Fine Art Gallery, New York, NY. Traveled to MOPA, San Diego, California
 2003 – Three Visions of Perú, Throckmorton Fine Art Gallery, New York, NY
 2004 – 100 Great Photographs, Victoria and Albert Museum, Traveled to Scottish National Gallery of Modern Art, England

Awards

 1980 – Best in Show Award, Art Auction, WPBT Channel 2; Miami, Florida
 1992 – National Endowment for the Arts (photography), U.S.A.

Public and corporate collections

Bibliography
 Mario Algaze, Michael Koetzle, & Enrique Fernandez; Portfolio Latinoamericano, (Kehayoff Verlag, 1998); 
 Jose Veigas-Zamora, Cristina Vives Gutierrez, Adolfo V. Nodal, Valia Garzon, Dannys Montes de Oca; Memoria: Cuban Art of the 20th Century; (California/International Arts Foundation 2001); 
 Jose Viegas; Memoria: Artes Visuales Cubanas Del Siglo Xx; (California Intl Arts 2004); 
 Helen D. Hume; The Art Teacher's Book of Lists; (Jossey-Bass 2003);

References

External links
 University Art Gallery- Muir College website article on the artist

1947 births
2022 deaths
Cuban contemporary artists
Cuban photographers
Cuban journalists
Miami Dade College alumni
Exiles of the Cuban Revolution in the United States
Cuban emigrants to the United States
People from Havana